Neponsit is a small affluent neighborhood located on the western half of the Rockaway Peninsula, the southernmost area of the New York City borough of Queens. The area starts at Beach 142nd Street and ends at Beach 149th Street. It borders the neighborhood of Belle Harbor to the east and Jacob Riis Park on the west. Jamaica Bay and the Atlantic Ocean are the northern and southern borders. The neighborhood is part of Queens Community Board 14. As of January 1, 2007, the neighborhood's population reached just over 2,000, making it one of the smallest communities on the peninsula and in the entire borough of Queens.

History
Neponsit is a Native American name meaning "the place between waters", the waters of the Atlantic Ocean and of Jamaica Bay or Rockaway Inlet.

The present community's character has persisted since it was established. In January 1910, the Neponsit Realty Company purchased the land for the development of an exclusive community. It forbade the construction of any homes that were inexpensive, and the homes were built in order to withstand the beach weather and geography of the narrow peninsula. The entrance to the area was originally marked by a massive ornamental gateway. More recently, a stretch of tree-dotted islands, called "the malls", situated along Rockaway Beach Boulevard, was a distinguishing feature. It extended through Belle Harbor. By the 1930s, high quality homes were dominant in Neponsit. 

The first transatlantic flight departed from Neponsit on May 8, 1919, when four United States Navy-Curtis model seaplanes took off from what is now Beach Channel Drive in Neponsit to Newfoundland, Canada, the Azores Islands, and Lisbon in Portugal. On May 31, 1919, a single plane piloted by Lt. Commander Albert C. Read arrived in Plymouth, England.

Land use and zoning
Neponsit is zoned for residential, one-or-two-story single-family homes. Due to this, and its secluded beach location, some homes are mansion-like, and the average market price for properties has approached $1 million, according to Zillow.

In popular culture
The television show, Rescue Me (FX Network) has regularly filmed in Neponsit using residences to portray the fictional homes of some of the characters, although the article points out that the "story never tells you how a firefighter can afford ... [a] Neponsit home"''.

See also
List of Queens neighborhoods
Naval Air Station Rockaway

References

Neighborhoods in Queens, New York
Neighborhoods in Rockaway, Queens
Populated coastal places in New York (state)